Sydney Francis Brews (29 May 1899 – 1972) was a South African professional golfer.

Brews was born in Blackheath, London, England. He turned pro in 1914 and emigrated to South Africa in 1924. He won the South African Open title a total of eight times between 1925 and 1952, when he became the tournament's oldest-ever champion aged 53. He also won the South African PGA Championship six times. His brother Jock Brews won the South African Open four times.

He enjoyed considerable success outside of South Africa. In 1934, probably his finest year, he finished second in the British Open to Henry Cotton, and won both the French Open and Dutch Open championships. He would retain both of those titles in 1935.

Tournament wins (32)

South African wins (26)
1925 South African Open
1926 South African PGA Championship
1927 South African Open
1928 South African PGA Championship
1930 South African Open
1931 South African Open
1933 South African Open, South African PGA Championship
1934 South African Open, South African PGA Championship
1936 South African PGA Championship
1949 South African Open
1952 South African Open, South African PGA Championship
Transvaal Open (South Africa): eight times
Natal Open (South Africa): four times

Other wins (6)
Note:  This list may be incomplete.
1929 Belgian Open
1934 French Open, Dutch Open
1935 Philadelphia PGA Invitational, French Open, Dutch Open

Results in major championships

Note: Brews only played in the U.S. Open and The Open Championship.

NT = No tournament
WD = withdrew
CUT = missed the half-way cut
"T" indicates a tie for a place

Team appearances
England–Scotland Professional Match (representing England): 1934 (winners)

South African male golfers
British emigrants to South Africa
1899 births
1972 deaths